Nikolai Nikolayevich Golubkin (born 6 September 1974) is a former Russian football player.

He represented Russia at the 1993 FIFA World Youth Championship.

External links
 

1974 births
People from Magnitogorsk
Living people
Soviet footballers
Russian footballers
Russia youth international footballers
FC Rostov players
Russian Premier League players
FC Lada-Tolyatti players
FC Kuban Krasnodar players
FC Dynamo Stavropol players
Association football defenders
Sportspeople from Chelyabinsk Oblast